Hamdan Al-Hamdan (born 2 December 1984) is a Saudi professional footballer who plays as a midfielder .

He played for many years for Al-Fateh, with whom he won the 2012–13 Saudi Professional League title. Internationally, he has two senior appearances for the Saudi national team.

Honours
Al-Fateh
 Saudi Professional League: 2012–13
 Saudi Super Cup: 2013

References

Living people
1984 births
People from Al-Hasa
Saudi Arabian footballers
Saudi Arabia international footballers
Association football midfielders
Al-Fateh SC players
Al-Orobah FC players
Al-Jabalain FC players
Al-Nojoom FC players
Saudi Second Division players
Saudi First Division League players
Saudi Professional League players